Chosen is a Danish streaming television series created by Jannik Tai Mosholt, Kaspar Munk and Christian Potalivo and starring Malaika Berenth Mosendane, Andrea Heick Gadeberg and Andreas Dittmer. It premiered on Netflix on January 27, 2022.

Cast 
 Malaika Berenth Mosendane as Emma
 Andrea Heick Gadeberg	as Marie
 Andreas Dittmer as Frederik
 Albert Rudbeck Lindhardt as Mads
 Mohamed Djeziri as Elvis
 Anders Heinrichsen as Lukas
 Magnus Juhl Andersen as Jonas
 Line Kruse as Lykke
 Marie Louise Wille as Susan
 Rikke Eberhardt Isen as Leyla
 Henrik Prip as Hans
 Nicolaj Kopernikus as Adrian
 Ken Vedsegaard as Thomas
 Eva Jin as Zannie
 Victor Pøhl as Nikolaj
 Jonas Munck Hansen as John Dinckler
 Sarah Rose Clear as Noreen
 Joen Højerslev as Svend

Episodes

References

External links
 
 

Danish television series
2022 Danish television series debuts
Danish-language Netflix original programming
Television series about teenagers